Kenneth Lo Lok Fung (born October 1938) is a Hong Kong billionaire businessman, chairman of the clothing manufacturer Crystal Group.

Early life
Kenneth Lo was born in mainland China in October 1938, the oldest son of Hong Kong businessman Law Ting Pong, also in the textiles industry. Lo and his family moved to Hong Kong when he was young, initially living in a refugee camp, where they survived off of meal coupons from the United Nations. Lo began working in his parents' garment factory at age 14.

His younger brother is fellow billionaire Law Kar Po.

Career
Lo's Crystal Group, which he established in 1970 with his wife, employs over 74,000 people in 20 locations, and an annual turnover of over US$2.5 billion. The company began as a small sweater factory, but now manufactures clothes for major brands such as H&M, Levi's, and Marks & Spencer. Lo stepped down from day-to-day operations in 2008, but remains involved with the company.

As of March 2022, Forbes estimated his net worth at US$1.0 billion.

Personal life
Lo's wife is Yvonne Lo, co-founder and vice chairman of Crystal Group. They have four children, and reside in Hong Kong. Their son, Andrew Lo, is CEO of Crystal Group.

References

External links 
 Textile Council

1938 births
Living people
Hong Kong billionaires
Hong Kong textiles industry businesspeople